Ammar Ramadan Abdel Aziz Mereg (born 5 February 1977) is a Sudanese former footballer who played as a defender. He formerly played for Al-Hilal. Ramadan was a member of the Sudan national football team.

External links 

1977 births
Living people
Sudanese footballers
Association football defenders
Al-Hilal Club (Omdurman) players
Muscat Club players
Alamal SC Atbara players
Sudan international footballers